Huangjin (黄金) may refer to these places in China:

Huangjin Township, a township in Ruichang, Jiangxi
Huangjin, Chongqing, a town in Zhong County, Chongqing
Huangjin, Guangdong, a town in Fengshun County, Guangdong
Huangjin, Guangxi, a town in Luocheng Mulao Autonomous County, Guangxi
Huangjin, Nanbu County, a town in Nanbu County, Sichuan
Huangjin, Xuanhan County, a town in Xuanhan County, Sichuan

Airports
Ganzhou Huangjin Airport, in Ganzhou, Jiangxi
Ganzhou Huangjin Airport (former)

See also
Yellow Turban Rebellion (184–205), a major rebellion in the late Han dynasty, also known as the Huangjin Rebellion